Super Bowl XXXII was an American football game played between the National Football Conference (NFC) champion and defending Super Bowl XXXI champion Green Bay Packers and the American Football Conference (AFC) champion Denver Broncos to decide the National Football League (NFL) champion for the 1997 season. The Broncos defeated the Packers by the score of 31–24. The game was played on January 25, 1998, at Qualcomm Stadium in San Diego, California, the second time that the Super Bowl was held in that city. Super Bowl XXXII also made Qualcomm Stadium the only stadium in history to host both the Super Bowl and the World Series in the same year.

This was Denver's first league championship after suffering four previous Super Bowl losses, and snapped a 13-game losing streak for AFC teams in the Super Bowl (the last win being the Los Angeles Raiders' win in Super Bowl XVIII after the 1983 season). The Broncos, who entered the game after posting a 12–4 regular-season record in 1997, became just the second wild card team to win a Super Bowl and the first since the Raiders in Super Bowl XV. The Packers, who entered the game as the defending Super Bowl XXXI champions after posting a 13–3 regular-season record, were the first team favored to win by double digits to lose a Super Bowl since the Minnesota Vikings in Super Bowl IV.

The game was close throughout much of the contest. The Broncos converted two turnovers to take a 17–7 lead in the second quarter before the Packers cut the score to 17–14 at halftime. Green Bay kept pace with Denver in the second half, before tying the game with 13:31 remaining. Both defenses stiffened until Broncos running back Terrell Davis scored the go-ahead touchdown with 1:45 left. Despite suffering a migraine headache that caused him to miss most of the second quarter, Davis (who is coincidentally a San Diego native) was named Super Bowl MVP. He ran for 157 yards, caught two passes for 8 yards, and scored a Super Bowl record three rushing touchdowns. As of 2023, Davis remains the most recent running back to be named Super Bowl MVP.

Background
NFL owners awarded Super Bowl XXXII to San Diego during their October 26, 1993 meeting in Chicago. This was the second time San Diego hosted the game; the city previously hosted Super Bowl XXII ten years earlier on January 31, 1988. The Broncos played in both San Diego Super Bowls and became the first franchise to play two different Super Bowls in the same stadium twice; they had already played twice at the Louisiana Superdome, in Super Bowls XII and XXIV.

Green Bay Packers

The Packers entered the 1997 season coming off of their win in Super Bowl XXXI. They then repeated as NFC Central division champions, earning a 13–3 regular-season record.  Green Bay's offense ranked 2nd in the league in points scored and 4th in yards gained, while their defense respectively ranked 5th and 7th in those two categories.

Quarterback Brett Favre had another Pro Bowl season and became the first player ever to win the NFL MVP award three times, winning it for the third consecutive year (Favre was named co-MVP in 1997 with Detroit Lions running back Barry Sanders). Favre led the league with 35 passing touchdowns and completed 304 out of 513 attempts for 3,867 yards, with 16 interceptions, while ranking second on the team in rushing with 187 yards and a touchdown. Wide receiver Antonio Freeman led the team in receptions with 81 catches for 1,243 yards and 12 touchdowns. Wide receiver Robert Brooks was also a major deep threat, catching 60 passes for 1,010 yards and 7 touchdowns. Pro Bowl tight end Mark Chmura recorded 38 receptions for 417 yards and 6 touchdowns. Pro Bowl halfback Dorsey Levens, who had the best season of his career, led the team in rushing with 1,435 yards and 7 touchdowns, while also catching 53 passes for 373 yards and 5 touchdowns. Fullback William Henderson rushed for 113 yards and caught 41 passes for 367 yards and a touchdown.  On special teams, receiver Bill Schroeder led the team with 33 punt returns for 342 yards, while also gaining 562 yards on 24 kickoff returns.

On the Packers' defense, the line was led by veteran Pro Bowl selection Reggie White, who led the team with 11 sacks. Behind him, Santana Dotson recorded 37 tackles and 5.5 sacks. In the secondary, Pro Bowl defensive back LeRoy Butler led the team with 5 interceptions, while also adding 70 tackles. Safety Eugene Robinson led the team with 74 tackles while also recording 2.5 sacks, 2 fumble recoveries, and 1 interception. Cornerback Mike Prior recorded 4 interceptions, while rookie Darren Sharper recorded 2 of them, both of which he returned for touchdowns.

Denver Broncos

The Broncos entered Super Bowl XXXII after suffering four Super Bowl losses: Super Bowls XII, XXI, XXII, and XXIV from 1978, 1987, 1988, and 1990, respectively. In all of those losses, the Broncos never had the ability to rush well enough or score enough points to be competitive. Denver had been defeated by a large margin in each one, losing all four by a combined scoring margin of 163–50.

The previous three Super Bowl losses were under starting quarterback John Elway, whose ad-libbing skills enabled the Broncos to advance to the league's championship game in a span of three out of four seasons. Elway also led his team to the 1991 AFC Championship Game, but they lost in a defensive struggle to the Buffalo Bills, 10–7.

The team's fortunes changed when Mike Shanahan became head coach of the Broncos in 1995. Shanahan was previously Denver's offensive coordinator during those Super Bowl losses, but was fired in 1991 after a power struggle between him and then-head coach Dan Reeves over the offensive personnel. Shanahan then served as the offensive coordinator for the San Francisco 49ers from 1992 to 1994, including the 49ers' Super Bowl XXIX win. Under Shanahan, the San Francisco offense ranked first in the league in total yards gained for all three of his seasons there.

When Shanahan returned to the Broncos in 1995, he selected running back Terrell Davis in the 6th round of the NFL draft. Davis became the cornerstone of Denver's rebuilt running game, leading the team with 1,117 rushing yards in just his rookie year. The Broncos finished the 1995 regular season with just an 8–8 record. By 1996, the Broncos had the league's best offense, gaining 5,791 total yards, and recorded the AFC's best regular-season record at 13–3, but they were upset by the second-year Jacksonville Jaguars, 30–27 in the playoffs.

During the 1997 regular season, the Broncos once again had the league's best offense with 5,872 total yards and led the league in total points scored with 472. Although they recorded a 12–4 regular-season record, they finished in second place behind the 13–3 Kansas City Chiefs in the AFC West.

Davis, a Pro Bowl selection, remained the team's leading rusher, recording 1,750 yards and 15 touchdowns, while also catching 42 passes for 287 yards. At 37 years old, Elway still posted a Pro Bowl season with 280 out of 502 completions for 3,635 yards, 27 touchdowns, and only 11 interceptions. He also rushed for 215 yards and another touchdown. Pro Bowl tight end Shannon Sharpe led the team with 72 receptions for 1,107 yards. Wide receiver Rod Smith, who was not drafted by any NFL team and recorded only 22 receptions for 389 yards and 3 touchdowns in his two previous seasons, had a breakout year with 70 receptions for 1,180 yards and 12 touchdowns. Wide receiver Ed McCaffrey, who played in Shanahan's 1994 49ers offense, recorded 45 receptions for 590 yards and 8 touchdowns. Denver's offensive line was led by seven-time Pro Bowl left tackle Gary Zimmerman and Pro Bowl center Tom Nalen.

On defense, the major acquisition to the team prior to the season was former Chiefs defensive lineman Neil Smith. Smith had a Pro Bowl season for the 6th time in his career with 28 tackles and 8.5 sacks. Defensive end Alfred Williams recorded 36 tackles, 8.5 sacks, and a fumble recovery. The linebacking corps was led by veteran Bill Romanowski, who had 55 tackles and 2 sacks, and John Mobley, who led the team with 97 tackles while also recording 4 sacks, a fumble recovery, and an interception.

The secondary was led by veteran defensive backs Tyrone Braxton, who led the team with 4 interceptions for 113 yards and 1 touchdown, and Steve Atwater, who had 53 tackles, 1 sack, 2 fumble recoveries, and 2 interceptions for 42 yards and 1 touchdown. Defensive back Darrien Gordon recorded 50 tackles, 2 sacks, 4 fumble recoveries, 4 interceptions, 64 return yards, and 1 touchdown. He also returned 40 punts for 543 yards and 3 touchdowns.

Playoffs

The Broncos entered the playoffs as a wild-card team and defeated the Jacksonville Jaguars, 42–17, the Kansas City Chiefs, 14–10, and the Pittsburgh Steelers, 24–21, making Denver the fifth wild-card team to make it to the Super Bowl. Meanwhile, the Packers were victorious against the Tampa Bay Buccaneers, 21–7, and the San Francisco 49ers, 23–10.

Super Bowl pregame news
The Packers came into the game as 11-point favorites, having compiled a 13–3 record regular-season record compared to the Broncos' 12–4 and coming in as defending Super Bowl champions after winning Super Bowl XXXI 35–21 over the New England Patriots.  Furthermore, the Packers had easily crushed their two playoff opponents, while the Broncos had barely edged out their final two postseason victories by a margin of one score.

As the designated home team in the annual rotation between AFC and NFC teams, the Broncos chose to wear their newly unveiled home navy uniforms with white pants. The uniforms replaced the "Orange Crush" uniforms they previously wore in three of their four Super Bowl losses. The Packers wore their customary road white uniforms with gold pants. Both teams wore the Super Bowl XXXII logo on the left breast of their jersey. The Super Bowl logo was previously worn in Super Bowl XXV to commemorate the game's silver anniversary. All future Super Bowls contestants would wear the game's logo on their jerseys.

Broadcasting
The game was televised in the United States by NBC, with play-by-play announcer Dick Enberg (calling his eighth and final Super Bowl), color commentators Phil Simms and Paul Maguire, and sideline reporter Jim Gray. Greg Gumbel hosted all the events, and was joined by co-host Ahmad Rashad and commentators Cris Collinsworth, Sam Wyche, and Joe Gibbs. This was Gumbel's final assignment for NBC as he returned to CBS for the 1998 season. Following the game, NBC aired a special one-hour episode of 3rd Rock from the Sun, which opened live at the game site with Gumbel playing himself before he was "attacked" by show star John Lithgow (except for the NBC affiliate in Denver, which broadcast 30 minutes of post-game reactions and interviews before screening the programme). During the game, NBC (partnering with Silicon Graphics Inc.) included real-time 3D computer graphics on SGI's Onyx2 computers to display a model of Qualcomm Stadium and simulating real-time animation of things such as receiver patterns and yards after the catch; along with a second model known as "Football Guy" which allowed viewers to see defensive players from the quarterback's vantage point, with those replays handled by Randy Cross.

This broadcast was the last for NBC as the AFC network after 33 years (CBS has held the AFC broadcast rights ever since), their last NFL broadcast overall until 2006, when they signed on to televise Sunday Night Football, and their last Super Bowl broadcast until 2009 (Super Bowl XLIII). This was also the last time Channel 4 in the United Kingdom showed the Super Bowl – and their last NFL coverage until 2010 – after they had been showing the event since 1983 (Super Bowl XVII). Only Sky Sports showed it live until Channel 5 joined them in 2003 (Super Bowl XXXVII).  It also marked the last Super Bowl until 2007 for CTV in Canada after airing the NFL and the event since Super Bowl XVI; from 1999 to 2006 the Super Bowl aired on the Global Television Network.  CTV had aired NFL football since 1970 and the Super Bowl since 1982 (Super Bowl XVI).  It was also the final NFL game for GMA Network in the Philippines until the 2006 season; GMA had aired NFL football since 1986 and the Super Bowl since Super Bowl XXI in 1987.  The Super Bowl was broadcast on ABC 5, also from 1999 until 2006.  It was also the final Super Bowl in which the Televisa family of networks aired on its own in Mexico, also until 2007, being broadcast on Canal 5; Televisa had aired NFL football since 1970 and the Super Bowl since 1988 (at the time, the only other Super Bowl in San Diego). Azteca 13 likewise exclusively aired all Super Bowls from 1999 until 2006, except for 2004, including Super Bowl XXXVII which was the next Super Bowl to be played at Qualcomm Stadium.

This game was later featured on NFL's Greatest Games as This One's for John.

Entertainment

Pregame ceremonies
The pregame show, narrated by actor and comedian Phil Hartman (who was murdered four months and three days later), celebrated the music and history of California. It featured performances by The 5th Dimension, Lee Greenwood, and The Beach Boys. Singer Jewel later sang the U.S. national anthem.

To honor the 10th anniversary of the Washington Redskins' win in Super Bowl XXII, the only other previous Super Bowl played in San Diego, the game's MVP, Doug Williams, and former head coach Joe Gibbs participated during the coin toss ceremony. They were joined by the recently retired, longtime college football head coach Eddie Robinson, who ran the Grambling State University Tigers football team from 1942 until 1997.

Halftime show
The halftime show was titled "A Tribute to Motown's 40th Anniversary" and featured Boyz II Men, Smokey Robinson, Queen Latifah, Martha Reeves and The Temptations.

Game summary

First quarter
Packers wide receiver Antonio Freeman returned the opening kickoff 19 yards to the Green Bay 24-yard line. On the third play of the drive, quarterback Brett Favre kept the offense on the field by completing a 13-yard pass to Freeman on 3rd down and 9. Then running back Dorsey Levens rushed the ball on three consecutive plays, gaining 27 yards to advance to the Denver 35-yard line. Favre finished the drive with two completions to Freeman: the first one for 13 yards, and the second one a 22-yard touchdown pass to give the Packers a 7–0 lead (the Packers were the third team to take the opening kickoff down the field and score a touchdown on that drive; the other two were the Miami Dolphins in Super Bowl VIII and the San Francisco 49ers in Super Bowl XXIX).

The Broncos responded with a touchdown of their own. Denver running back Vaughn Hebron returned the ensuing kickoff 32 yards to their own 42-yard line. Denver then drove to the Green Bay 46-yard line. On third down, a holding penalty on Packers defensive back Doug Evans nullified quarterback John Elway's incompletion and gave the Broncos a first down. On the next play, running back Terrell Davis ran the ball 27 yards to the 14-yard line. Then after a 2-yard run by Davis, Elway scrambled 10 yards to gain a first down at the 2-yard line. Two plays later, Davis capped off the 10-play, 58-yard drive with a 1-yard touchdown run to tie the game. On the second play of the Packers' next possession, Denver defensive back Tyrone Braxton intercepted a pass from Favre at Green Bay's 45-yard line.

Second quarter
Aided by five runs by Davis for 29 yards, Denver marched 45 yards to score on Elway's 1-yard touchdown run on the first play of the 2nd quarter, taking a 14–7 lead. Elway's touchdown play involved a fake handoff to Davis, who was previously taken out of the game during the drive because the onset of a migraine headache after being inadvertently tripped by LeRoy Butler had severely impaired his vision. But head coach Mike Shanahan decided to send him into the game for the 3rd-down play, believing that the Packers would not be fooled by a fake handoff without Davis on the field. Davis later said his vision was so impaired that he was afraid Elway would call an audible at the line and try to hand him the ball. Despite his blurred vision, Davis perfectly executed the play, drawing the Green Bay defense into the middle of the line as Elway rushed to the right and into the end zone completely untouched. By the second half, Davis had taken migraine medication, and his vision had returned to normal, allowing him to play the rest of the game.

On the Packers' ensuing possession, Broncos safety Steve Atwater forced a fumble while sacking Favre, and defensive end Neil Smith recovered the ball on the Packers 33-yard line. Although the Broncos were unable to get a first down, kicker Jason Elam made a 51-yard field goal, the second-longest in Super Bowl history, to increase Denver's lead to 17–7. Both teams went three-and-out on their next possessions, and Denver punter Tom Rouen's 47-yard kick planted Green Bay at their own 5-yard line with 7:38 left in the quarter. But Green Bay stormed down the field on their ensuing drive, marching 95 yards in 17 plays and scoring with Favre's 6-yard touchdown pass to tight end Mark Chmura with just 12 seconds left in the half. Thus at halftime, the Broncos held a slim 17–14 lead.

Third quarter
Green Bay kicked to Denver to start the second half.  On the first play after the kickoff, Packer defensive back Tyrone Williams forced and recovered a fumble from Davis.  Green Bay took possession with good field position at the Broncos' 26-yard line to begin the second half.  But Denver's defense forced a three-and-out.  However, on the ensuing field goal attempt, Denver's special teams were called for an offsides penalty, giving the Packers a second 1st and 10 at the Broncos' 15-yard line.  But the Broncos defense forced a second three-and-out in back-to-back possessions, stalling the Packers' drive at the 9-yard line and forcing them to settle for a 27-yard Ryan Longwell field goal, tying the game at 17–17.

Green Bay kicked off once again and Denver's offense stalled once more, resulting in a punt, giving the Packers possession with good field position again, this time near their 40-yard line. But Denver's defense forced another three-and-out for the third straight time.  However, again on the ensuing punt, the Broncos' special teams were called for an offsides penalty, giving Green Bay a fresh set of downs near midfield.  Denver's defense then forced another punt with a fourth three-and-out in a row.

Green Bay punter Craig Hentrich's 51-yard kick pinned the Broncos back at their own 8-yard line. But the Packers' defense could not stop Denver as they marched on a 13-play, 92-yard drive to regain the lead. Aided by a 36-yard reception by receiver Ed McCaffrey, the Broncos advanced to the Green Bay 12-yard line.  On 3rd and 6 from the 12-yard line, Elway scrambled for an 8-yard run and dove for the first down, a play in which he was hit so hard by Packers defenders Butler and Mike Prior that he spun sideways in mid-air. This run was later referred to as "The Helicopter," and what many consider as Elway's career-defining moment and the defining moment of Super Bowl XXXII. Two plays later, Davis scored on another 1-yard touchdown run, giving the Broncos the lead, 24–17.

On the ensuing kickoff, Denver's special teams player Detron Smith ran full speed into the wedge of the Green Bay blockers, forcing Freeman outside, to his left. Freeman was hit as he held the ball exposed while running sideways and fumbled, then Denver defensive back Tim McKyer recovered the ball at the Packers' 22-yard line. The Broncos immediately tried to capitalize on the turnover by trying a quick-strike touchdown pass, intended for Rod Smith as he ran a post pattern following a fake handoff and a roll out by Elway, but Packers safety Eugene Robinson intercepted Elway's pass in the end zone and returned it to the 15-yard line.

Fourth quarter
After the interception, the Packers marched 85 yards on four straight pass completions, three of them receptions by Freeman, to tie the game once again 1:28 into the 4th quarter with Freeman's 13-yard touchdown catch. On the scoring play, Freeman and Robert Brooks ran a "criss-cross" pattern, with Freeman on the inside running towards the sidelines. Denver defensive back Darrien Gordon hesitated as to which receiver to cover, and Favre hit Freeman for the score, tying the game at 24–24.

After the ensuing kick-off, the Packers forced Denver's offense to punt.  With a short punt of only 33 yards, the Packers took possession with good field position, having 1st-and-10 at their own 48-yard line.   The Packers drove to Denver's 39-yard line.  On 3rd and 8, Favre dropped back to pass and Denver's defense blitzed, leaving Packers receiver Robert Brooks to face one-on-one coverage deep.  Favre attempted the pass to a seemingly wide-open Brooks at Denver's 16-yard line, but Broncos safety Steve Atwater closed in and knocked the pass away at the last second, leaving the Packers just outside of field-goal range and forcing another punt.  The Packers' defense was able to stop Denver's offense on the ensuing possession again, giving Green Bay 1st-and-10 at their own 10-yard line with 5:25 remaining in the game and a chance at a game winning drive with Favre, the 3-time league MVP, at the helm.  With the game in the balance, the Broncos defense forced a fifth critical three-and-out in the second half.

Packers kicker Hentrich then punted the ball 39 yards to the Packers' 49-yard line, giving Denver a chance to end the game on a potentially game-winning drive with only 3:27 left in the game.  On the first play of the ensuing drive, Packers linebacker Darius Holland committed a 15-yard face-mask penalty while tackling Davis on a 2-yard run, moving the ball to the 32-yard line. Two plays later, Elway completed a 23-yard pass to fullback Howard Griffith, aided by a powerful block by Ed McCaffrey. A holding penalty pushed the Broncos back to the 18-yard line, but then Davis rushed 17 yards to the 1-yard line, and the Broncos called a time-out. This left the Broncos facing 2nd and goal with 1:47 left on the clock.  Green Bay had two time-outs remaining.

Packers coach Mike Holmgren told his team to let the Broncos score to maximize the time the Packers would have on the clock for a potential game-tying drive. He admitted later that he had thought that it was 1st and goal rather than 2nd and goal, a crucial distinction in clock-management decision-making on the play.  Davis then scored his third rushing touchdown on 2nd and goal, leaving 1:45 on the clock. The Broncos now had a one-touchdown lead, with the score 31–24.

The Packers attempted one final drive to try to tie the game before the end of regulation and send the contest into overtime.  Shanahan famously instructed his defensive coordinators to keep playing the same blitzing defense they'd done throughout the game as Green Bay attempted to drive downfield in the final two minutes, rather than playing prevent defense.  Freeman returned the Broncos' kickoff 22 yards to the 30-yard line.  On the very first play of the drive, the Packers advanced to the Broncos' 48-yard line with a 22-yard screen pass to Levens, leaving them in Broncos territory with 1:30 still remaining in the game and two time-outs.  But following the first pass, rather than use one of their time-outs, the Packers hurried to the line of scrimmage and ran a second consecutive screen pass to Levens.  The pass was complete, but Levens was stopped for no gain.  The play cost the Packers 19 seconds, leaving 1:11 on the game clock and also forcing the Packers to take one of their two time-outs.

On the next play Favre completed another pass to Levens.  Levens picked up 13 yards and was able to run out of bounds, stopping the clock with 1:04 left in the game.  The Packers had 1st-and-10 at the Broncos' 35-yard line with one time-out remaining.  The Broncos defense would stop the Packers on the next four downs.  On the first-down play, Favre completed a 4-yard pass to Levens, but he was stopped in-bounds.  The Packers hurried to the line but 20 seconds ran off before Favre could attempt a second pass.  On second down, Favre attempted a pass downfield that hit receiver Antonio Freeman in both hands and the chest at the Broncos' 15, but Freeman could not handle the ball.  The incomplete pass stopped the clock, but left the Packers with 3rd-and-6 and now only 37 seconds remaining.  On 3rd down, Favre intended the pass for receiver Robert Brooks, covered by Denver's Randy Hilliard, but both were hit by Atwater, and the pass was incomplete.  All three players were knocked out of the game.  Because of NFL rules regarding injuries to players in the final two minutes of a game, both teams were charged a time-out since players on both teams were injured and needed to be tended to.  This left the Packers facing 4th and 6 with the ball at the Broncos' 31-yard line, with no time-outs and the clock stopped with 32 seconds remaining.  On 4th down, Denver linebacker John Mobley broke up a pass intended for Chmura, enabling the Broncos to take the ball back and run out the clock for the victory.

Post-game
During the post-game victory celebration, Broncos owner Pat Bowlen held the Vince Lombardi Trophy in the air and said, "This one's for John," referring to the fact that Elway's long quest for a Super Bowl victory was finally complete. Eighteen years later, Elway, now general manager for the team, would salute an Alzheimer's-stricken Bowlen in the same fashion after the Broncos won Super Bowl 50.

A remarkable fact about Denver's offensive performance was that, except for two penalties and Elway's kneel-downs to end each half, the Broncos did not lose yardage on any play from scrimmage.  Green Bay's Reggie White, Gilbert Brown, LeRoy Butler and others were unable to register a sack against the Broncos' front line.  Elway completed 12 out of 22 passes for 123 yards, with 1 interception. He became the sixth player to score touchdowns in three different Super Bowls, joining Lynn Swann, Franco Harris, Thurman Thomas, Jerry Rice, and Emmitt Smith.  He was also the Broncos' second-leading rusher behind Davis, with 17 yards and a touchdown on 5 carries. Terrell Davis became the only player to rush for three touchdowns in a Super Bowl, and the only non-San Francisco 49er to score three touchdowns in a Super Bowl; Roger Craig, Jerry Rice, and Ricky Watters were the only other players to do so.  Rice had 3 touchdown catches in two different Super Bowls. This feat has only been accomplished one time since Davis, by James White in Super Bowl LI. Davis's three touchdowns in this Super Bowl gave him a total of 48 points (8 touchdowns) during the postseason, an NFL record.

Denver's defense limited Green Bay to only 10 points in the second half, despite Green Bay having nine possessions in the second half.  The Packers' first four possessions of the second half were all 3-and-out's.  Their fifth possession of the second half resulted in a lost fumble by their kick return team, the sixth possession resulted in an 85-yard drive and a touchdown, the seventh ended in four plays and a punt, the  eighth resulted in another 3-and-out, and the ninth and final possession ended on a fourth down stop.

Levens was Green Bay's leading rusher with 90 rushing yards, and was their second-leading receiver with 56 yards on 6 receptions. Both Freeman and Favre had outstanding performances for the second Super Bowl game in a row. Favre completed 25 out of 42 passes for 256 yards and 3 touchdowns, with 1 interception. Freeman caught 9 passes for 126 yards and 2 touchdowns, and also gained another 104 yards on 6 kickoff returns, giving him 230 total yards, the third highest total in Super Bowl history. Freeman also tied himself for second all-time in touchdown catches in Super Bowls with three, joining Lynn Swann, John Stallworth, and Cliff Branch, trailing only Rice's eight. He also became just the third player to have at least 100 yards receiving in back-to-back Super Bowls, joining Rice and Stallworth.

Denver was the first team with a previous 0–2 Super Bowl record to win (their record had been 0–4). The Broncos' victory snapped the NFC's 13-game winning streak in the Super Bowl. The Broncos were the first AFC team to win the NFL championship since the Los Angeles Raiders defeated the Washington Redskins in Super Bowl XVIII. Denver also became the first team to score on four 1-yard touchdown runs in a Super Bowl. The Packers became the third defending Super Bowl champion to lose the Super Bowl, joining the Dallas Cowboys (1977–78: won Super Bowl XII, lost Super Bowl XIII) and the Washington Redskins (1982–83: won Super Bowl XVII, lost Super Bowl XVIII), and would be later joined by the Seattle Seahawks (2013–14: won Super Bowl XLVIII, lost Super Bowl XLIX), the New England Patriots (2016–17: won Super Bowl LI, lost Super Bowl LII) and the Kansas City Chiefs (2019-20: won Super Bowl LIV, lost Super Bowl LV).

Box score

Final statistics
Sources: NFL.com Super Bowl XXXII, Super Bowl XXXII Play Finder Den, Super Bowl XXXII Play Finder GB

Statistical comparison

Individual statistics

1Completions/attempts
2Carries
3Long gain
4Receptions
5Times targeted

Records set
One new record was set and several were tied in Super Bowl XXXII, according to the official NFL.com boxscore, the 2016 NFL Record & Fact Book and the ProFootball reference.com game summary.

Starting lineups
Source:

Officials
 Referee: Ed Hochuli #85 first Super Bowl
 Umpire: Jim Quirk #5 first Super Bowl
 Head Linesman: John Schleyer #21 first Super Bowl
 Line Judge: Ben Montgomery #117 first Super Bowl
 Back Judge: Paul Baetz #22 third Super Bowl (XXIII, XXVI)
 Side Judge: Doug Toole #4 first Super Bowl
 Field Judge: Don Dorkowski #113 first Super Bowl
 Alternate Referee: Dick Hantak #105 (back judge for XVII, referee for XXVII)
 Alternate Umpire: Ed Coukart #71 first Super Bowl

NOTE: the titles of field judge and back judge were swapped before the next season.

John Robison was originally assigned as the field judge, but was pulled by Vice President of Officiating Jerry Seeman after he missed a call in the Vikings-Giants wild card game. Don Dorkowski, the field judge for the NFC championship game, was named as Robison's replacement.

References

External links
 

Super Bowl 032
Denver Broncos postseason
Green Bay Packers postseason
1997 National Football League season
American football in San Diego
1998 in American football
1998 in sports in California
1990s in San Diego
Sports competitions in San Diego
January 1998 sports events in the United States
1998 in American sports
1998 in American television